The 1975 Rothmans International Trophy was a men's professional tennis tournament held on indoor carpet courts at the Royal Albert Hall in London, England. It was the fifth edition of the event and was held from 4 March until 8 March 1975. The tournament was a special non–ranking event on the 1975 World Championship Tennis circuit consisting of eight nations and 16 players. Mark Cox won the singles title.

Finals

Singles
 Mark Cox defeated  Brian Fairlie 6–1, 7–5

Doubles
 Paolo Bertolucci /  Adriano Panatta defeated  Jürgen Fassbender /  Hans-Jürgen Pohmann 6–3, 6–4

Country standings

References

External links
 ITF tournament edition details

Rothmans International Tennis Tournament
Rothmans International Tennis Tournament
Rothmans International Tennis Tournament
Rothmans International Tennis Tournament
Rothmans International Trophy